Clemente Estable (23 May 1894, Canelones – 27 October 1976, Montevideo) was a university professor and docent. He was a pioneer in the areas of cellular biology and neurobiology research. Estable was an educator, scientist and philosopher who left his mark on the intellectual collective thinking of his native land. He lived his life guided by strong democratic values and ethical principles and worked tirelessly to better the pedagogic, cinematic, political and scientific frameworks of the day.

Today, the 'Instituto de Investigaciones Biologicas Clemente Estable' (of which he was a founding member) carries on his scientific work and carries his name.

Biography
Estable was born on 23 May 1894, close to San Juan Bautista. This was the historical name of what is now known as the Town of Santa Lucia, Canelones, Uruguay. Born of Italian immigrants, his parents Giuseppe Stabile and Giuseppa Fallobella met and married in Uruguay in 1877.

A few years later, the family re-located to La Union, an area that, at the time, was semi-rural, although situated on the outskirts of the capital city of Montevideo. His parents had a farm and ran a grocery store, that was manned, in part, by Clemente and his brothers. He learnt how to read with his older brother Nicolas, who mentored him and prepared him academically to attend the post-secondary Instituto Normal (teacher's college). He was accepted, enrolled, and was awarded a full scholarship at the age of fifteen, in 1909. While enrolled at college in the daytime, he completed the remainder of his studies by attending night school at La Union.

Parallel to this formal education, Clemente Estable's relentless thirst for knowledge took an auto-didactic route, as he dedicated himself to the study of Nature. He studies psychology, biology, and, most importantly, helps develop the nascent branch of microscopic biology.

In 1914, he graduates from the Teacher's College and dedicates his efforts to teaching in some of the public schools of the city of Montevideo. In particular, Primary School #38, where he taught 2nd Grade, the Artigas School, and later the Espana Vocational School.

By 1917, he is already teaching teachers-to-be at the Teacher's College he once attended. Three years later, in 1920, he is awarded a post as 'Maestro de Conferencias adscripto a la Inspeccion Tecnica de Ensenanza Privada'. As the chief inspector, overseeing the technical proficiency of vocational (trades and technical) schools.

In 1921, at the age of 27, he has published his first book, El Reino de las Vocaciones (The Kingdom of Vocations). The published work is a series of lectures Estable presented in June, July and August to the Sociedad de Pedagogia (Pedagogical Society) of Uruguay.

In 1922, he receives a grant from the Government of Spain to attend the Histologic Research Institute of Madrid.  He studies under the tutorship of Santiago Ramón y Cajal (Nobel Prize recipient). Estable stays there, researching and studying, for three full years.

He continues his studies in Europe, notably in France, Germany, Austria, Monaco and Italy, birthplace of his parents. His travels and studies in Europe lead him to psychological and biological research laboratories, where he works side-by-side with some of the most distinguished scientists of the day.

In 1925, he returns to Montevideo, Uruguay, after garnering international recognition as a research scientist abroad. He returns, humbly, to his post at the Vocational Institute, overseeing the technical proficiency of the schools under his direction. In order to accommodate Estable's growing interest with cinema and his fledgling film projects, the name of his posting is changed to 'Laboratorio de Ciencias Biologicas y Cinematografia” (Laboratory of Biology and Cinematography).

Not having secured a physical space adequate for carrying out his work and research into cinematography, education, and science was a setback. Fortunately, Dr. Americo Ricaldone awarded him an exceptional posting at the Neurological Institute. During this time he meets and courts Isabel Puig, a teacher. They marry and have three children: Isabel, Clemente and Juan Francisco.

In 1927, the cinematography branch of the Biological Sciences Laboratory became a separate institution. Its new function was to research, develop and culturally enrich the elementary school curriculum for the public school sector.

By 1930, Estable had claimed a place as a research scientist and a brilliant teacher with unswerving principles. Turning his attention to reform, he devises an educational plan, known as The Plan Estable. This plan for national educational reform has, as its core principles, the teaching of the scientific method of investigation as a teaching/learning tool. In the framework of The Plan Estable, the scientific method is put into place in the areas of both Natural and Applied Sciences. Further, its educational principles are based on what was, by now, a solid foundation in Psychology and Pedagogy in the person of Clemente Estable and that of his wife and gifted teacher, Isabel. In point of fact, she home-schooled their three children, Isabel, Clemente and Juan Francisco, after leaving her career as School Principal to marry.
In 1930, Clemente Estable, the President of The Uruguayan Society of Biologists, presides over the First International Congress of Biologists, in Montevideo, Uruguay.

In 1931, Estable is awarded a professorship at the Law School (Preparacion de Abogacia), teaching in the field of Biology, where he incorporates innovative teaching methods at the post-secondary level.

In 1932, Clemente Estable's achievements as a research scientist and educator are well-rewarded, and he is invited to become a lecturer, receives an Honorary Degree, and teaches at University of Santiago, Chile in Concepcion, Chile.

In 1937, his native Uruguay follows suit, and he is named Honorary Professor at The Faculty of Medicine, Montevideo.
In 1940, Estable becomes a guest lecturer at multiple Universities, Colleges, and Scientific Institutes. As an invited professor, he presents lectures, presents research findings, and demonstrates scientific and cinematic techniques.
In 1948, he presides over the first Latin American Scientists Congress, organized by UNESCO.
In 1956, he travels to India, as part of a Uruguayan delegation.
In 1959, he is given the title: Honorary Professor of Universidad de Montevideo by the Council of Secondary and Preparatory Colleges.
In 1960, The Chamber of Elected Representatives of The Republic render him official recognition.
In 1962, he is awarded the Legion of Honour by the government of France. In the same year, Italy awards him an honorary position as a member of La Academia Medica de Roma (The Medical Academy of Rome).

On 27 October 1976, Clemente Estable died at the age of 82. Due to his exceptional contributions to the cultural, pedagogic, political and scientific arenas of his native land, Clemente Estable was buried with full ceremony reserved for Ministers of State.

On the occasion of the 100th Anniversary of his birth, Uruguay released a stamp in his honor, bearing his name, image and likeness. In 1994 on the occasion of the centennial of his birth the Uruguayan legislature passed a law 16.572 that in each of the 19 Departments of Uruguay there would be a public elementary school named after him.

Research
Professor Clemente Estable was one of the three main players in the development of Biology and Research Sciences in his native Uruguay. The other two being Ernesto H. Cardero (1890-19310) and Francisco A. Saez (1890–1976).

He was an avid supporter of Uruguay's Research Sciences, in particular, Biology. Parallel to this, he pioneered a philosophy and curricula that raised public learning/teaching institutions to foster vocation-based approaches.

In 1920, Estable receives a full scholarship from the Government of Spain to study at a laboratory led by the Nobel Peace Prize recipient Don Santiago Ramon-y-Cajal. Under his mentorship, Clemente Estable dedicates himself to studying the architecture of the human nervous system. In 1923, he publishes original findings on the histological structure of the cerebellum, in a magazine edited by Ramon-y-Cajal.

A tireless research scientist, he explored the central nervous systems of many organisms with diverse and original techniques he devised. This approach led him to experimental theses that were really cutting-edge. After several years of study, Clemente Estable postulated theories on the functioning of the nerve cells, or the physiology of neurotransmitters.
 
These Avant-garde understandings surpassed his venerated teacher's theories on the polarization of the neurons. The theories Clemente Estable put forward, particularly those linked to the physiological functioning of the synapses ( inter-neuronal contact points) are still held to be true.
According to Estable, scientific research, artistic creation, or philosophical reflections should offer the possibility of living in dignity in civil society. Further, he proposes that the scientist, the artist and the philosopher all fulfill an essential function in the life of the Nation. Thus, it is the responsibility of the elected public officials to promote these and create adequate conditions for them to execute the work.

Thanks to his philosophy, reputation and moral and ethical comportment, Estable was able to achieve two of his objectives:
1) The creation of a State-funded Institute for Biological Sciences and Research (est 1927). The Instituto de Ciencias Biologicas Clemente Estable carries his name to the present day

2) The establishment of a full-time labour pool based on vocational training and individualized technical education for the masses.

Bibliography
 El Reino de las Vocaciones
 1914 – El Valor de la Objetivacion en la Ensenanza, published by Solidaridad
 1915 – La Nutricion, published by Solidaridad
 1915 – The Scholastic Competitions, published by Solidaridad
 1918 - " De la observación y sus medios." Rodo,Montevideo. Vol.1. nǘm.1,pp.9-11.enero 
 1918 - " Rotación de maestros en la las clases." Rodó, Montevideo. Vol.1, nǘm. 2, pp.15-16,febrero
 1918 - " Higiene sexual en las escuelas." Rodó, Montevideo. Vol.1, núm.1,pp.13-14,enero
 1918 - " Las proyecciones luminosas en la enseñanza. Rodó. Montevideo. Vol.1, núm.5,pp,11, marzo.
 1918 - " Las libretas de lecciones." Rodó. Montevideo. Vol.1, núm.5, pp.13-14,mayo.
 1918 - " Dios por las escuelas." Rodó. Montevideo. Vol.1, núm 6,pp.4-5,junio.
 1918 - " Encaminar a los niños a las buenas obras literarias" Rodó. Montevideo. Vol.1, núm.8,pp.4-8,agosto
 1918 - " Cursos de vacaciones." Rodó. Montevideo. Vol.1, núm.10 p.6, octubre
 1918 - " Huerto interno."Rodó. Montevideo. Vol.1, núms. 11-12, p.30,noviembre-diciembre
 1918 - " Pinceladas inarmónicas [1]."Rodó. Montevideo. Vol.1, núm.5,pp.5-6,mayo
 1918 - " Pinceladas inarmónicas [2]."Rodó. Montevideo. Vol.1, núm.7,pp.5-6,julio
 1918 - " Pinceladas inarmónicas [3]."Rodó. Montevideo. Vol.1, núm.8,p.3,agosto
 1918 - " La sugestion [1]." Rodó. Montevideo. Vol.1, núm.9,p.14,setiembre
 1919 - " Historia de una planta humilde." La Unión. Montevideo,enero
 1919 - " La sugestion [2]." Rodó. Montevideo. Vol.2, núm.13-14,pp.1-20,enero-febrero
 1919 - " Reflexiones sobre la creencia y la duda." La Educación. Montevideo. Aňo II, núms.25-26,febrero
 1919 - " Pinceladas inarmónicas [4]."Rodó. Montevideo. Vol.2, núm.15,p.5-6,marzo
 1919 - " De nuestros estudiosos:Historia de una planta humilde.La Razón.Montevideo,21 de marzo.
 1919 - " Asueto del jueves y periodo de vacaciones." Montevideo. Tipografia Morales Hnos.pp.13-17
 1919 - " Superarse a si mismo. A mi intimo amigo Sebastian Morey Otero." La Unión. Montevideo,31 de agosto
 1919 - " El sueldo de los maestros. Educación.Montevideo. AñoII.Num.37,pp.1-3,28 de octubre
 1920 - " Sintesis y sugestiones de las conferencias que Pi y Suñer dictó en Montevideo." Anales de instrucción primaria y normal. Montevideo Año XVII,XVIII,Vol.17 núms.1-3,pp.16-35, enero a marzo 
 1921 - " Clases de Biología. ( Resumen de las dictadas a los maestros que asistieron a los cursos de vacaciones.)- Conversaciones de Entomología, Doctrina de la neurona,Significación del hambre, en el origen del conocimiento, Cerebro y Corazon." Anales de instrucción primaria. Montevideo.Año XVIII,XIX,Tomo XVIII. Núm 9,pp.937-989,setiembre
 1921 - " El Reino de las Vocaciónes;Fin Supremo de la Enseñanza." Imprenta Escuela Naval. 153 paginas.
 1922 - " Elementos de Biología,por Isídro Más de Ayala." Anales de instrucción primaria y normal. Montevideo Año XIX,XX,Tomo 19.Núm. 5,pp.416-420,mayo.
 1923 - " Notes sur la structure comparative de L'ecorce céré belleuse, et derivées physiologiques possibles. Travaux de laboratoire de recherches biologiques de l'université de Madrid. Vol.21 pp.169-256. 
 1924 - "Systemes osmatiques et cause histologique posible de la pluralite d'energies olfactives specifiques. Travaux de laboratoire de recherches biologiques de l'université de Madrid. Vol.22 pp.169-358.
 1924 - " Terminaisons nerveuses branchiales de la larve du pleurodeles a waitlii de certaines donnees sur l'innervation gustative.Travaux de laboratoire de recherches biologiques de l'université de Madrid. Vol.22 pp.369-384
 1926 - " El ángulo vísual de nuestra enseñanza es mucho más estrecha que el ángulo vocacional de la vida." La Cruz del Sur. Montevideo., vol.3,Núm.11,pp.2-3,febrero.
 1926 - " La vendimia del espiritu. La Cruz del Sur. Montevideo. Vol.3. Núm. 15, pp.4-5, julio,agosto.

External links
 Wikimedia Commons - Multimedia Content – m. Clemente Estable -
 Webpage of “Institituto de Investigacions Biologicas Clemente Estable”
 Uruguayan Medical Association
 Latin Space
 Complete biography
 

1894 births
1976 deaths
Uruguayan people of Italian descent
People from Santa Lucía, Uruguay
Uruguayan neuroscientists